Sandon is a village and civil parish just off junction 17 of the A12 in Essex, England, adjacent to Great Baddow and close to Danbury. The population taken at the 2011 Census includes Howe Green and totals 1,613. It was known for an ancient oak tree covering most of the village green. This rare Spanish oak was planted in 1888 to mark Queen Victoria's Golden Jubilee. It was removed for safety reasons in 2000 after collapsing due to long-standing fungal infection (this oak tree was used by a local artist for many of his paintings, and is still represented on the village sign). Three new oak trees were planted on the village green to continue its legacy and mark Queen Elizabeth II's Golden Jubilee.

Sandon has a secondary school, which is on Molrams Lane, the border between Sandon and Great Baddow. The Sandon School in Chelmsford, Essex is an 11-18 mixed comprehensive academy school of 1200 students. The school also hosts Sandon Soccer, Chelmsford's only FA short sided soccer venue.

Sandon's only pub is The Crown, which is situated on the village green opposite St Andrew's Church. Foundation stones from a long-demolished village primary school can be spotted in the walls of the pub car park.

There are two pits located next to the A12 created by gravel extraction during previous decades. In recent years these pits have been subject to an application to be utilized as landfill sites, but have since been planted on and are used by children as play areas and by dog walkers.

Major changes to the village over the last 40 years include the building of the Gablefields estate (on the east edge of the village) on the site of the old Gable Farm in 1975, the construction of the A12 bypass further to the east around 1986, and the construction in the intervening area of an extension to Gablefields, The Lintons, in the 1990s.

References

External links
Essex Walks

Villages in Essex
Civil parishes in Essex